Ugeskrift for Læger (English: Weekly Journal for Physicians) is a Danish medical journal published every Monday. It is written in Danish, and publishes original research, news, debate, job ads, etc. The journal was established in 1839 and has been available online since 1999.

External links
  (in Danish)

Publications established in 1839
Weekly journals
General medical journals
Danish-language journals